The 24K Magic World Tour was the fourth concert tour of American singer-songwriter Bruno Mars that was performed in support of his third studio album 24K Magic (2016) from March 2017 to December 2018. Anderson .Paak was the opening act for the first European leg while Camila Cabello, Dua Lipa and Jorja Smith opened the shows during the first North American leg. In Latin America, DNCE, Bebe Rexha and Nick Jonas were the supporting acts, and in Oceania, Lipa and DJ Leggo My Fueggo opened shows. The second European leg included appearances at several music festivals such as Pinkpop in the Netherlands and Rock in Rio in Portugal. It was Mars's first tour to include a show in Africa, where he appeared at the Mawazine festival in Morocco.

In 2018, Mars announced another tour leg in North America; it was initially to feature Cardi B but she wanted to raise her newborn child and was replaced with Boyz II Men, Ciara, Ella Mai and Charlie Wilson. Apart from 24K Magic, the tour setlist included songs from Mars's previous albums Doo-Wops & Hooligans (2010) and Unorthodox Jukebox (2012), as well as the Mark Ronson-Mars collaboration "Uptown Funk" (2014), which was often used for the encores alongside "Locked Out of Heaven". Mars was backed by an eight-piece band called The Hooligans and performed dances choreographed by him and Phil Tayag.

The 24K Magic World Tour received generally positive reviews from music critics, who praised Mars's showmanship and his guitar solos, as well as the stage production. His shows attracted a wide-ranging audience of all age groups and grossed over $367 million, making the 24K Magic World Tour a commercial success and one of the highest-grossing concert tours of all time. It won two Pollstar awards, two Billboard Music Awards and a TEC Award.

Background and production
The 24K Magic World Tour, with 85 dates across Europe and North America, was officially announced on November 15, 2016. On November 22, 2016, 15 additional shows were added, bringing the number to 100. At that time, the tour's producers Live Nation Entertainment reported that over one million tickets for the tour had been sold in a single day. Promotional trailers and behind-the-scenes footage of the tour were released through Live Nation on several official YouTube channels as additional promotion in some markets including Germany and Hong Kong. Bruno Mars, together with Phil Tayag of the hip-hop dance crew Jabbawockeez, choreographed the tour while the production and lighting design were handled by LeRoy Bennett, who worked with Mars on his Moonshine Jungle Tour (2013–2014). On May 2, 2017, Mars partnered with Heineken to sell tickets for his U.S. shows in selected cities; fans could obtain tickets by donating $150 to Heineken's Cities Project, which was intended to improve U.S. cities, via the Indiegogo crowdfunding platform. The tour's South American leg was sponsored by Banco do Brasil and Budweiser, and Hospital Sancta Maggiore was the official supplier. Pepsi was the official soft-drink partner during the Asian leg of the tour, which visited China, Thailand, the Philippines, Singapore and Malaysia.

According to Front of House (FOH) engineer Chris Rabold, Mars had a say in every aspect of the tour's shows, which he envisioned as a huge party. Rehearsals for the 24K Magic World Tour commenced at Center Staging in Burbank, California, in mid-2016; they included only The Hooligans as performers, assisted by monitor engineer Ramon Morales, who mixed the monitors for Mars. Morales then moved to the Rock Lititz rehearsal facility for a few weeks to complete work on the tour's production using equipment made by Clair Global, the tour's official sound equipment provider. Rabold and Morales used two DiGiCo SD7 mixing consoles and monitors for the tour's production. The Hooligans used Sennheiser 9000 series microphones while Mars used a Sennheiser 5235. Microphones made by Shure, Telefunken and Mojave were used for the drums while the guitars had AT4050s, SM57s and Royer 122s microphones. The horns used DPA 4099s, the bass an Avalon U5 and the synth had both a Sennheiser 906s and a Beyer M88 microphone.

Morales mostly used the DiGiCo's onboard effects such as reverbs, delays, dynamic equalization and compression on the inputs. He also chose an Avalon 737 for Mars's vocals, as well as a Brascati M7 reverb and TC system 6000. The public address system (PA) used on the tour was Clair Global's Cohesion system. Lighting designer Cory FitzGerald and production designer LeRoy Bennett used the Philips VL6000 Beam and VL4000 BeamWash fixtures for the tour. These have a retro-style appearance to match the shows' 1990s theme and blend with the more contemporary-looking classic Par Can lights' bright colors and textures. The VL4000 BeamWash provided backlight, sidelight, and bright-and-bold effects. Around 214 Solaris Flares were used in pixel mode, including the wash features and the strobe lights.

Concert synopsis

During the first leg of the tour in Europe, shows were opened by Anderson .Paak, who drummed and sang simultaneously. The shows in North America—except for the first two shows, which opened with Jabbawockeez—had either Camila Cabello, Dua Lipa or Jorja Smith as the opening act. On November 18, 2017, the Latin American leg of the tour began with DNCE, and ended with Bebe Rexha and Nick Jonas. Initially, all concerts in Oceania were scheduled to be opened by Lipa but she canceled four dates due to dental problems and was replaced by DJ Leggo My Fueggo. During the second European and North American legs of the tour, Mars had several opening acts, including DJ Rashida, at every show. Charlie Wilson, Ciara, Boyz II Men and other high-profile acts appeared on select occasions, replacing Cardi B, who wanted to raise her newborn baby, on the North American leg. At all shows, a large, black curtain was used to introduce Mars's band, The Hooligans, who were followed by text asking if the audience was ready to "get hot and sweaty".

"Finesse" opened the set against a backdrop of colorful, pulsing tower panels. During the performance of the follow-up song "24K Magic", which led to the audience cheering and dancing, the tower panels changed colors and were complemented by fireworks. At this point, Mars would shout, "We have been waiting a long time to come back ... we gonna have some fun tonight!", before continuing dancing to "Treasure" and "Perm". During "Perm", Mars invited his fans to take pictures of him and The Hooligans, briefly stopping the show. During "Calling All My Lovelies", the next track on the setlist, Mars played his guitar in a tribute to Prince; Mars pretended to call his lover on a "Zack Morris-style phone" but she did not answer the call. This was followed by the "racier" songs "Chunky" and "That's What I Like", on which critics said Mars and his band sounded like Boyz II Men. The singer "turned up the sexual energy" with "Straight Up & Down", which has "risqué" subject matter but was delivered in a "family friendly and inoffensive" way.

The setlist continued with "Versace on the Floor", during which Mars was lifted on a platform with golden lighting and purple beacons. The next number, "Marry You", had Mars and The Hooligans performing a "soft-shoe" dance while Mars played guitar. On the subsequent "Runaway Baby", Mars and his band performed "pelvic" dance moves that critics compared to Elvis Presley; there followed a breakdown similar to James Brown's work. During the song, the lights dimmed and only a bass solo was being played. Afterwards, a modified routine of The Isley Brothers' song "Shout" had Mars dropping to the floor then emerging from it with a roar. Later on, the stage was occupied only by Mars and two keyboard players for the piano ballad "When I Was Your Man". A piano solo led up to the next ballad "Grenade", to which was Mars give a rock interpretation by playing his guitar. Shots of fireballs were featured during the song.

The next song on the 2017 setlist was the ballad "Just the Way You Are", which was performed before the encore. For the encore, they returned to perform "Locked Out of Heaven", during which golden confetti was poured on the audience, and the closing song "Uptown Funk", during which fireworks and smoke prompted men dressed as firefighters to use fire extinguishers to put them out. Throughout the tour, modified setlists were used. "Too Good to Say Goodbye" was only performed in Madrid and Antwerp as the closing track. "Billionaire" replaced "Calling All My Lovelies" during Mars's second date in Rio de Janeiro. "Talking to the Moon" was performed once, as an encore, in São Paulo. In some shows, "Grenade" was replaced with "Gorilla" or a mash-up of "Nothin' on You" and "It Will Rain". In 2018, "Grenade" and "Straight Up & Down" were removed from the setlist of several concerts.

On July 10, 2018, during a concert at Glasgow Green, in Scotland, Mars and his band had to evacuate the stage due to a fire. It was caused by "a planned fireworks display that caused the lighting rig to catch fire". The incident didn't cause any injuries.

Critical response

Selected shows of the tour received generally positive reviews from critics, who commended Mars's showmanship, his guitar skills and the stage production. Caroline Sullivan of The Guardian rated a show four stars out of five, saying; "It says something about his performance ethic that even during the formation dances he's clearly not miming – most pop singers do while dancing". Sullivan added most of the concert "comes from a wellspring of perspiration, musical education and at least a little inspiration". The Washington Post Briana Younger called Mars a "once-in-a-generation artist", and "a master of his craft and consummate performer". Jesse Sendejas Jr., writing for the Houston Press, said Mars and his band "came to entertain and did that astonishingly well" in a show which, according to her, attracted a wide-ranging audience of all age groups and cultures. The Pittsburgh Post-Gazettes Scott Mervis lauded Mars's "silky voice" and his Michael Jackson-esque dance skills, "to which he adds a comic touch". Mervis concluded, "If [Jackson], Prince and James Brown are the 24K gold standard for what he's trying to do, Mars is well on his way toward that karat".

Tammy Kwan of The Georgia Straight called Mars's and The Hoolligans's performance "stellar", noting its "synchronized dancing and dazzling stage effects". Kwan added, "This concert was one for the books". The Musics Madelyn Tait praised the concert, writing; "Mars was able to leave a diverse, all-ages crowd [that was] satisfied with his funk and soul-infused pop and proved how capable he is of putting on a fun, entertaining arena show". Leticia Madrigal of The Clovis Roundup lauded Mars "do[ing] more than enough entertaining through his choreographed performance with his band and with his unmissable radio hits". Some critics found the performance of "When I Was Your Man" to be the highlight in the performances they commented on.

Mikael Wood of the Los Angeles Times said there were some "less polished moments" in the show he attended but that they were not accidental. Wood also said Mars had "gotten so good onstage that he's begun looking for a thrill beyond perfection" and concluded; "the impression Mars gave was of an artist eager to put some wrinkles into the gleaming surfaces for which he's known". Neil McCormick of The Telegraph gave a concert four stars out of five. He praised the choreography and the vocal harmonies, which he felt were inspired by Prince's "supernatural gifts", James Brown's "physical command", and Marvin Gaye's "smooth vocal flexibility". He did not, however, enjoy the band's "mustard and white baseball" outfits, saying they made them look like "servers at a fast-food chain".

In a mixed review, Luís Guerra from Blitz lauded one of the shows for its variety of genres but said Mars performed romantic songs inadequately. Radio New Zealand's Ellen Falconer commended Mars's showmanship, saying he put on a "hell of a show" and calling him one of the best performers of his generation. Nevertheless, she found him "over-polished" and felt "his own personality gets lost amongst [his] nostalgic references". Roisin O'Connor of The Independent gave a concert three stars out of five, saying songs like "Marry You" and "The Lazy Song" sounded "dated" when compared to those on 24K Magic. She concluded by saying "all the ingredients for a spectacular show are there, yet a stellar performance doesn't seem to reach the far corners of the arena".

Accolades

Commercial performance

According to an October 2017 Billboard article, the tour had sold 659,190 tickets at 42 concerts in 32 cities in North America and earned $76 million in revenue there. This included three sold-out shows at United Center in Chicago, which garnered $6.3 million. Concerts at the O2 Arena in London earned $6.6 million. In early 2018, it was reported 408,443 tickets had been sold for the ten shows Mars performed in Latin America, bringing in $37.4 million. In Asia, fourteen shows in seven cities were sold out while in Japan, the tour grossed $15.5 million from four shows at Saitama Super Arena.

In Australia, the 24K Magic World Tour with its five shows at Sydney's Qudos Bank Arena brought in $9.2 million. Mars broke Beyoncé's New Zealand concert attendance record in May 2017, surpassing her 44,596 ticket sales by selling 48,783 tickets for four sold-out concerts at Spark Arena in Auckland. In 2018, Mars sold out the three shows at the Aloha Stadium in Hawaii, breaking the attendance records of both U2 and Michael Jackson, who performed two nights for 50,000 people.

In 2017, StubHub ranked Mars as the biggest-touring act of the year in the United States, having sold more tickets than any other artist. The 24K Magic World Tour's total gross as of October 2017 was $129 million, which grew to $200 million as of January 2018. It was the fourth-highest-grossing tour of 2018 with a revenue of $237.8 million according to Billboard. Over a span of two years, the 24K Magic World Tour was reported to have grossed over $367,7 million. It is among the highest-grossing concert tours of all time. For Mars's November 8, 2018, concert in Hawaii, widespread ticket reselling activities occurred and bots were used to buy thousands of tickets. A similar phenomenon happened on his second show in the state.

Set lists
The set lists given below were performed in April 2017 and March 2018, respectively. The list evolved over the course of the tour, and sometimes included other numbers. These included "Too Good to Say Goodbye", "Gorilla" or a mash-up of "Nothin' On You" with "It Will Rain", "Talking to the Moon", "Billionaire", and "Thinking Out Loud" performed with Ed Sheeran.

 "Finesse"
 "24K Magic"
 "Treasure"
 "Perm"
 "Calling All My Lovelies"
 "Chunky"
 "That's What I Like"
 "Straight Up & Down"
 "Versace on the Floor"
 "Marry You"
 "Runaway Baby"
 "When I Was Your Man"
 "Grenade"
 "Just the Way You Are"
Encore
 "Locked Out of Heaven"
 "Uptown Funk"

 "Finesse"
 "24K Magic"
 "Treasure"
 "Perm"
 "Calling All My Lovelies"
 "Chunky"
 "That's What I Like"
 "Versace on the Floor"
 "Marry You"
 "Runaway Baby"
 "When I Was Your Man"
 "Locked Out of Heaven"
 "Just the Way You Are"
Encore
 "Uptown Funk"

Shows

Personnel

The Hooligans
 Bruno Mars – vocals
 Philip Lawrence – backup vocals (2017–2018)
 Phredley Brown – lead guitar and backup vocals
 Jamareo Artis – bass guitar
 Eric Hernandez – drums
 Kameron Whalum – trombone and backup vocals
 Dwayne Dugger – saxophone and keyboard
 James King – trumpet and backup vocals
 John Fossit – keyboards

Management
 Brian Bassham – stage manager
 Michele Bernstein – tour marketing executive, for William Morris Endeavor (WME)
 Brian Cohen – Tony Goldring 51
 Move Concerts – production (at least in Brazil)
 Michael Coppel – chairman, Live Nation Australia
 Joel Forman – production manager
 Shaun Hoffman – tour manager
 John Marx – personal management, for William Morris Endeavor (WME)
 Live Nation – production
 Live Music Rocks – promoter (at least in Brazil)
 Phil Rodriguez – CEO, move Concerts

Sound and monitor production
 Jacob Caples – technician (2018–present)
 Andrew Dowling – systems engineer/crew chief (2018–present)
 Andrea Espinoza – technician (2017–2018)
 Matthew Gallagher – technician (2018–present)
 Scotty McGrath – audio engineer
 Ramon Morales – monitor engineer
 Chris Rabold – FOH engineer
 Bill Sheppell – FOH engineer (2018–present)
 Chris "Sully" Sullivan – systems engineer/crew chief
 Robert "Bobby" Taylor III –technician (2017–2018)
 Paul Tobey – RF technician

Stage production
 John Arrowsmith – pyro tech shooter, crew chief
 LeRoy Bennett – production, lighting designer
 Paul Brackett – carpenter
 Brian Bukovinsky – lighting tech
 Christopher Butterfield – automation
 Darren D'Amour – pyro tech
 Stave Davidson – rigger
 Lashard Davis – carpenter
 Libby Dostart – production coordinator
 Steve Fatone – video director
 Cory FitzGerald – co-lighting designer, programmer
 Stan Fruge – automation operator, crew chief
 Jeff Goldsmith – carpenter
 James Harrelson Jr. – rigger
 Kiel Heerding – automation
 Whitney Hoversten – lighting director, programmer
 Kurt Jenks – carpenters head
 Mark Jones – pyro tech
 Chris Lanning – dimmer tech
 Christian Lind – video tech
 Ryan LeComte – dimmer tech
 Kenn MacDonald – laser tech
 Kevin McConville – automation
 Dan McLaughlin – automation
 Dave Medrano – carpenter
 Carlos Oldigs – master electrician
 Taylor Pesqueira – production assistant
 Josh Phebus – video tech
 Thomas Poje – lighting tech
 Doscher Shewmake – carpenter
 Lee Shull – video tech
 Krystena Rice – video crew chief
 Jerry Ritter – riggers head
 Eric Taylor – laser tech operator
 Kevin Tokunaga –video tech engineer
 Soline Velazquez – lighting crew chief
 Angelo Viacava – lighting tech

Notes

References 

2017 concert tours
2018 concert tours
Bruno Mars concert tours
Concert tours of Europe
Concert tours of the United Kingdom
Concert tours of Canada
Concert tours of the United States
Concert tours of North America
Concert tours of South America